The constant ratio plan was one of the first plans devised when institutions started to invest in the stock market. The plan is often called rebalancing. Another type of plan is called a "variable ratio plan". There are several ways of executing these plans. The simplest is called the Constant Dollar Plan, which has been discussed in various investing books.

Description
One possible scenario is an investor with $10,000 dollars to invest. He invests half into stocks, and the other half into bonds or a money market fund. If his shares cost $10.00, he invested $5,000.00, so he has 500 shares. Later after a market move, he finds his shares are valued at $3.00 a share, so he has lost 70% of his stock portfolio. He now transfers $3,500 into the stock portfolio, in order to bring the value back to $5,000.00. He now has 1,666 shares. Later, the market recovers and his shares are now valued at $10.00 a share. His shares are now worth $16,660; he sells $11,660 and puts the proceeds into his bond portfolio. He now has $5,000 in the stock market and $13,160 in bonds.

Further reading
Practical Formulas for Successful Investing, by Lucile (Tomlinson) Wessmann, W. Funk (1953)

Investment